Enrique Santos Discépolo (Discepolín) (27 March 1901 – 23 December 1951) was an Argentine tango and milonga musician and composer, author of famous tangos like Cambalache and many others performed by several of the most important singers of his time, amongst them notably Carlos Gardel. He was also a filmmaker, actor and screenwriter.

Life

Discépolo was born in Buenos Aires on March 27, 1901.  He was devoted to the arts from an early age and tried acting and theatre writing, with moderate success, before finally dedicating himself to tango. Although his decision to write popular music was not unrelated from his previous exchanges with theatre and acting, his elder brother Armando resisted this move and therefore in the beginning things were not easy for Enrique. Armando had taken over his education after his parents died when Enrique was very young.

He wrote a few songs including the famous Que vachaché ("What Will You Do?") with little success until 1928, when singer Azucena Maizani performed his number Esta noche me emborracho ("I'm Getting Drunk Tonight"). Days after this performance, the tango's lyrics circulated across the nation and earned notoriety. Later that year, actress and singer Tita Merello rescued Que vachaché, and propelled it to the same popularity as Esta noche me emborracho. To finish a great year in 1928, he also met his partner, Tania, who would accompany him for the rest of his life.

He continued to gain fame the following years, and, in 1934, he wrote Cambalache, its lyrics not only describing the political climate of its era, but also nearly predicting its future. Cambalache is often quoted by Argentines regarding the extent to which its lyrics apply today.

Discépolo died from a heart attack on December 24, 1951.

Style
Discépolo was versatile in his styling, having the ability to write songs that were ironic and moralistic, like Yira... yira..., Cambalache, romantic like Sueño de juventud, sarcastic (Justo el 31, Chorra), expressionist (Soy un arlequín, Quién más, quién menos), passionate (Confesión, Canción desesperada) and nostalgic (Uno, Cafetín de Buenos Aires).

His tango songs, as those of most other tango composers, make extensive use of lunfardo, thus making understanding his lyrics an exercise in patience for listeners unused to that dialect.

Selected Songs

Infamia ("Infamy")
Que vachaché ("What Will You Do?")
Yira... yira...
Que sapa señor ("What's New, Sir?")
Cambalache ("Junkshop")
Sueño de juventud ("A Young Man's Dream")
Justo el 31 ("Right on the 31")
Chorra ("She-Thief")
Soy un arlequín ("I Am a Harlequin")
Quién más, quién menos ("Who More, Who Less")
Confesión ("Confession")
Canción desesperada ("Desperate Song")
Uno ("One")
Cafetín de Buenos Aires ("Buenos Aires Cafe")

Selected filmography
Discépolo directed or co-directed a number of films:

 Four Hearts (1939)
 Caprichosa y millonaria (Petty and Millionaire) (1940)
 Un señor mucamo (1940)
 By the Light of a Star (En la luz de una estrella) (1941)
 Fantasmas en Buenos Aires (Ghosts in Buenos Aires (1942)
 Candida, Woman of the Year (1943)
 The Fan (1951)

References

External links
 Todo Tango
 Brief biography and some lyrics
 
 
 

1901 births
1951 deaths
20th-century Argentine male actors
20th-century dramatists and playwrights
20th-century Argentine male singers
Argentine composers
Argentine dramatists and playwrights
Argentine film directors
Argentine film score composers
Argentine male film actors
Argentine male singer-songwriters
Argentine people of Italian descent
Burials at La Chacarita Cemetery
Male dramatists and playwrights
Male film score composers
Male screenwriters
Musicians from Buenos Aires
Tango musicians
20th-century Argentine male writers
20th-century Argentine screenwriters